This is a list of exoplanets observed during the Kepler space telescope's K2 mission.

On 31 March 2022, K2-2016-BLG-0005Lb was reported to be the most distant exoplanet found by Kepler to date.

List

References

 

Exoplanets discovered by the Kepler space telescope
Kepler space telescope
Lists of exoplanets
Transiting exoplanets